Dreams Never Die is the debut studio album by South African hip hop recording trio Dreamteam. The album was released on July 31, 2015.

Track listing

Release history

References

2015 debut albums
Dreamteam albums
Albums produced by Tweezy